Lucie Paul-Margueritte (9 January 1886 - 10 May 1955) was a French-language writer and translator. She was the recipient of the Legion of Honour as well as multiple awards from the Académie Française. She lived and worked with her widowed sister, Ève Paul-Margueritte.

Biography
Lucie Blanche Paul-Margueritte was born 9 January 1886, in Paris. She was the daughter of Paul Margueritte, the niece of Victor Margueritte, and the granddaughter of General Jean Auguste Margueritte. Thanks to her father and her uncle, she became acquainted with Stéphane Mallarmé, Alphonse Daudet, Guillaume Apollinaire, and Louis Bertrand. She was well-traveled, visiting Algeria, Corsica, and Italy.

Paul-Margueritte began publishing in magazines at the age of eighteen. After three years of marriage, she divorced and thereafter lived with her widowed sister, Ève Paul-Margueritte. Together, they raised the latter's son, living from their writings. She translated many English novels, including Bram Stoker's Dracula. She served as director of the publication of Scène et monde: périodique illustré, publie des comédies, contes et poèmes tous les mois (Stage and World: illustrated periodical, publishing plays, stories and poems every month) from 1939 to 1944.

Like her sister, Paul-Margueritte was a member of the first women's gastronomic club, the "Club des belles perdrix".

Lucie Paul-Margueritte died in Paris, 10 May 1955. She is buried along with her sister in the Cimetière d'Auteuil, Paris.

Awards and honors 
 Legion of Honour, 1930
 Prix d’Académie, from the Académie Française, 1930 
 Prix du concours de la Chanson française for Premier amour, 1934
 Prix Kornmann, Académie Française, 1941
 Prix d’Académie, Académie Française, 1943
 Prix d’Académie, Académie Française, 1944
 Prix Jean-Jacques-Berger, Académie Française, for le guide Auteuil-Passy, 1947
 Prix Georges-Dupau, Académie Française, 1950
 Prix Alice-Louis-Barthou, Académie Française, 1954

Selected works

Books

 Paillettes, 1908 
 Les Colombes, A. Michel, 1915
 Le Singe et son violon, 1918
 "L'avertissement. Nouvelle", Le Gaulois du dimanche, 14 August 1920
 Les Confidences libertines, 1922
 La jeune fille mal élevée, 1922
 El camino mas largo 
 La lanterne chinoise, 1930
 Le miroir magique: sur des thèmes chinois, vingt-six poèmes, 1932
 L'Amant démasqué, 1933
 Tunisiennes, 1937 
 Deux frères, deux sœurs, deux époques littéraires, 1951 (with Eve Paul-Margueritte)
 Auteuil et Passy, 1947 (with Eve Paul-Margueritte)
 En Algérie: enquêtes et souvenirs, 1948
 L'Oncle Amiral: contes chinois, ca. 1955

Translations

 Les Plans du Bruce-Partington, 1910; from The Adventure of the Bruce-Partington Plans, by Conan Doyle
 La Chasse à l'homme; from a story by E. Phillips Oppenheim
 Le Second Déluge, 1912 (with Ève Paul-Margueritte); from The Second Deluge, by Garrett P. Serviss
 La Belle aux cheveux d'or, 1912 (with Ève Paul-Margueritte); from a story by Alice and Claude Askew
 Sept belles pécheresses: Duchesse de Chateauroux, Duchesse de Kendal, Catherine II de Russie, Duchesse de Kingston, Comtesse de Lamotte,  Duchesse de Polignac, Lola Montes, 1913 (with Ève Paul-Margueritte); from Seven splendid sinners, by W. R. H. ( (William Rutherford Hayes)) Trowbridge
 Vers les étoiles, 1914, (with Ève Paul-Margueritte); from Stairways to the Stars by Lilian Turner
 L'homme de la nuit, 1920 (with Ève Paul-Margueritte); from Dracula, by Bram Stoker
 A jolie fille, joli garçon. Le Procès des épingles d'or. Miroir de beauté. Les Amours de Mme Fleur. 1922; adapted from stories by Jingu qiguan
 Le Lama rouge, et autres contes, 1923 (with Tcheng-Loh), from 60 stories in Yuewei caotang biji (zh) (閱微草堂筆記), by Ji Yun 
 El camino más largo, 1927; from Le Chemin des écolières, by Albin Michel
 Ts'ing Ngai ou Les plaisirs contrariés: conte chinois ancien adapté des Kin-kou-ki-kouan, 1927; from a story by Jingu qiguan
 Amour filial, légendes chinoises: les vingt-quatre exemples de piété filiale, 1929; French adaptation of Er shi si xiao (zh) (二十四孝)
 Chants berbères du Maroc, 1935; adaptation
 Proverbes kurdes, 1937 (preceded by a study on Kurdish poetry by Lucie Paul-Margueritte and the Emir Bedir Khan Beg, containing the translation of poems by Elî Teremaxî)
 La Folle d'amour, confession d'une chinoise du XVIIIe siècle, 1949 (adapted by Lucie Paul-Margueritte); from a story by Meng li Lo

Articles
 "Une audience de la reine Marie de Roumanie", 1926
 "En Tunisie", Les Annales coloniales, 1938
 "Dans le Djurjura", Scène et Monde, 1940

Plays
 Un bouquet perdu, comedy in one act, creation: Studio des Champs-Elysées, 1933
 Le Hasard et les concubines, comedy in one act, creation: Studio des Champs-Elysées, 1933
 Quand elles parlent d'amour, Théâtre Albert Ier (now, Théâtre Tristan-Bernard, 1934
 ''Sylvette ou Sylvie ?, comedy in one act with dances, created by Théâtre Comœdia, 1932

Notes

References

Sources
 Rapazzini, Francesco. Indomptables. À l’avant-garde du XXe siècle, Éditions e-dite, 2013, biographies (ISBN 978-2-846-08344-7)

1886 births
1955 deaths
20th-century French novelists
20th-century French non-fiction writers
20th-century French dramatists and playwrights
20th-century French translators
20th-century French women writers
Writers from Paris
Translators to French
English–French translators
Lucie